William Henry Byrne (17 May 184428 April 1917) was an Irish architect who mainly designed churches. He studied under James Joseph McCarthy before going into business with John O’Neill in 1869. He worked on his own after O'Neill's death in 1883.

W.H.Byrne & Son
In 1902 he took his own son Ralph into partnership.

Type of work
He designed mainly churches, though his main Dublin work was the South City Markets in George's Street.

Designs
Mary Immaculate, Refuge of Sinners Church, Rathmines, Dublin, extended (date unknown) church (designed by Patrick Byrne, 1854)
Church of the Sacred Heart, the Crescent, Limerick, 1868
Design for interior of Chapel, St Patrick's College, Maynooth, entry was unsuccessful, 1888
South City Markets, South Great George's Street, 1881
Former Dockrells, South Great George's Street, Dublin, 1888
Tholsel, Drogheda, County Louth, 1890 conversion of 1770 building by George Darley into a bank
Sheil Hospital, Ballyshannon, County Donegal, 1891
MacHale Memorial Church, Tubbernavine, County Mayo, 1891
Church of the Three Patrons, Rathgar, Dublin, 1891 (facade for church built from 1860 to 1862 by Patrick Byrne)
Church of the Immaculate Conception, Louth, County Louth, 1892
De La Salle College Waterford, 1894
Presbytery, Roscommon, County Roscommon, 1895
Conciliation Hall, Burgh Quay, Dublin, 1897 (rebuild of 1843 building by Peter Martin as a concert hall)
Holy Redeemer Church, Bray, 1898 (remodelling of 1852 church by Peter Byrne)
Carmelite Abbey, Loughrea, County Galway, 1899
Church of the Assumption, Howth, 1899
Former bank, Thomas Street, Dublin, 1902
Mary Immaculate College, Limerick, 1903
St Joseph's Church, Terenure, 1904
St John's Church, Dublin Road, Kilkenny, 1907
No 58, Upper O'Connell Street, Dublin, 1922 (date rebuilt)

References

19th-century Irish architects
20th-century Irish architects
1844 births
1917 deaths